Enteromius tetraspilus is a species of cyprinid fish in the genus Enteromius. It is endemic to the Democratic republic of the Congo.

Footnotes 

 

Enteromius
Taxa named by Georg Johann Pfeffer
Fish described in 1896